Syrianarpia faunieralis is a species of moth in the family Crambidae described by Mauro Gianti in 2005. It is found in the Cottian Alps in Italy.

The wingspan is 31–33 mm. The forewings ground colour is brownish grey, but paler in some areas forming a faintly contrasting pattern. The hindwings are slightly paler than the forewings and are faintly scaled.

Etymology
The species is named for the type location: Cima Fauniera, a mountain in the Grana Valley.

References

Moths described in 2005
Scopariinae
Endemic fauna of Italy
Moths of Europe